Torsten Kracht (born 4 October 1967) is a retired East German and German football player.

Career
The defender made in total over 275 appearances East German and German top-flights. Kracht has collected two caps for East Germany. With 12 red and yellow/red cards, he is the most sent-off player in Bundesliga history.

Statistics

References

External links

 
 
 

Living people
1967 births
German footballers
East German footballers
East Germany international footballers
Association football defenders
1. FC Lokomotive Leipzig players
VfB Stuttgart players
VfL Bochum players
Eintracht Frankfurt players
Karlsruher SC players
Bundesliga players
2. Bundesliga players
DDR-Oberliga players
People from Grimma
Footballers from Saxony
People from Bezirk Leipzig